Tracy Floyd Robertson  (born September 26, 1989) is a professional American football defensive tackle who is currently a free agent. He played college football at Baylor. He signed with the Houston Texans as an undrafted free agent in 2012.

Early years
Robertson attended Lamar High School in Houston, Texas. Robertson was selected to the first team All-District 20-5A honors. Robertson finished high school with 83 tackles, 11 sacks along with 2 fumble recoveries. Robertson was named one of state's Top 25 defensive linemen by Texas Football magazine.

College career
He played college football at Baylor University. During his tenure in Baylor, he recorded 44 tackles and 7.5 sacks. He played in 44 games and started 27 of them.

In his freshman year, he played 9 games coming off bench. On October 4, 2008, he recorded a season high 2 Tackles against the No.1 ranked Oklahoma but Baylor lost in a blowout 49-17.  On November 1, 2008, he had just one tackle against Missouri but Baylor lost 31-28.

In his sophomore year, he played in all 12 games, and started at defensive end. He finished the season with 22 tackles, including 5 tackles for loss, 3 sacks.  On October 17, 2009, he recorded a career high 5 tackles against Iowa State but Baylor lost 10-24. On November 7, 2009, he recorded 5 tackles and 2 sacks against Missouri and Baylor won 40-32.  On November 28, 2009, in the season finale against Texas Tech, he recorded 2 tackles and one sack but Baylor lost 20-13. Baylor finished the 2009 season with a 4-8 record.

In his junior year, he played 10 games and started 9 of them.  He started the season as a defensive tackle until the fourth game. He missed the next three games due to injury. On September 11, 2010, he recorded 3 tackles, including two tackles, and three QB hurries against Buffalo in which Baylor won 34-6. On October 16, 2010, he just recorded 2 tackles against Colorado and Baylor won 31-25. On October 23, 2010, he recorded 4 tackles Kansas State contributing to Baylor winning the game by the final score of 47-42.

In his senior year, he played in 13 games and started 11 games and he recorded 23 tackles and 4.5 sacks. On October 1, 2011, he recorded 4 tackles and 2 sacks against Kansas State but Baylor lost 36-35. In next game against Iowa State, he recorded one sack while Baylor won 49-26.

Professional career

Houston Texans
After going undrafted in the 2012 NFL Draft, he was signed by the Houston Texans. On July 30, 2012, he was released.

Detroit Lions
On August 2, 2012, he signed with the Detroit Lions. On August 31, 2012, he was released on the final day of roster cuts.

New England Patriots
On January 1, 2013, Robertson was signed to the New England Patriots practice squad. On April 29, 2013, the Patriots released Robertson.

Miami Dolphins
On June 13, 2013, he signed with the Miami Dolphins. On August 31, 2013, he was released by the Dolphins.

Chicago Bears
On October 14, 2013, he was signed to the Chicago Bears practice squad. On November 22, he was promoted to the active roster, making his debut in week twelve against the St. Louis Rams, but was released on November 29. He returned to the practice squad on December 3. On August 30, 2014, he was part of the final cuts by the Bears.

Toronto Argonauts
On February 5, 2014, it was announced that Robertson had signed with the Toronto Argonauts.

References

External links
 Toronto Argonauts profile
 Baylor profile

1989 births
Living people
American football defensive tackles
American players of Canadian football
Canadian football defensive linemen
Baylor Bears football players
Chicago Bears players
Detroit Lions players
Houston Texans players
Toronto Argonauts players
Players of American football from Houston
Players of Canadian football from Houston